Kodolányi János University (Hungarian: Kodolányi János Egyetem or KJU in short) is a private higher education institution in Hungary with its main campus in Budapest. It has regional campuses in Székesfehérvár and Orosháza. According to its mission statement, the university is dedicated to fostering moral citizenship and promoting local identities.

As of 2022, Kodolányi János University has 3000 students organised into fourteen departments. It offers Bachelor's and Master's programmes in Hungarian and English. It has a library on each of its three campuses, offering access and support to students with disabilities. The university has international partnerships with institutions from 36 countries.

History 
The institution was established in Székesfehérvár in 1992, following the plans of Lajos Rockenbauer and Péter Szabó, with the support of Bertalan Andrásfalvy, former Minister of Education. It was named after writer János Kodolányi due to his contributions to the city. In 1994, the institution started its own local radio station. Its Budapest campus was inaugurated in 1998. The Orosháza campus was opened in 2004. It is the first university in Székesfehérvár, and has operated as a college until July 31, 2018. 

In 2020, Kodolányi János University was acquired by Docler Holding, a corporate group focused on information technologies.

Organisation and administration 
The Rector of Kodolányi János University is the head administrator, appointed and overseen by the academic board. The university is divided into five major institutes.

 The Institute for Social Well-Being includes the Departments of English Language and Literature, Human Development Studies, International Relations, History and Cultural Studies.
 The Institute for Sustainable Economy includes the Departments of Business and Management, as well as Tourism and Logistics.
 The Institute for Informatics includes the Department of Informatics.
 The Institute for Creative Industries includes the Departments of Communication and Media Studies, Cinematography and Television Art, and Contemporary Music.
 The Institute for International Relations includes the Department of Interdisciplinary International Studies as well as the Centre of International Development and Services.

Notable alumni 

 György Gattyán, businessman
 Gergely Böszörményi Nagy, entrepreneur

External links

References 

Universities and colleges in Hungary